Moycashel, previously the barony of Rossaughe, and before that, Delamares country, is a barony in south County Westmeath, in the Republic of Ireland. It was formed by 1542. It is bordered by three other baronies: Clonlonan to the west, Rathconrath to the north, Moyashel and Magheradernon to the north-east and Fartullagh to the west. The largest population centre is Kilbeggan.

Geography
The barony contains a part of the south–west end of Lough Ennell and the River Brosna flows through Kilbeggan before it connects to the River Shannon.

The M6 motorway passes through the barony to the south of Kilbeggan and (together with the M4) links Dublin with Galway.

The N52, a national secondary road passes through Kilbeggan linking  the M7 motorway from just south of Nenagh, County Tipperary to the M1 motorway north of Dundalk in County Louth.

The R446 regional road (the old N6) runs through Kilbeggan and roughly parallel to the M6, also connecting Dublin with Galway.

In addition the R389 (linking Kilbeggan to the R392 near Moyvore) and the R391 (linking Clara, County Offaly to Mullingar, County Westmeath) pass through the barony.

Civil parishes of the barony 
This table lists an historical geographical sub-division of the barony known as the civil parish (not to be confused with an Ecclesiastical parish).

Towns, villages and townlands
Ballynagore
Castletown Geoghegan
Dysart
Kilbeggan
Rosemount
Streamstown

There are 171 townlands in the barony of Moycashel.

Buildings and other places of note
Kilbeggan Distillery
Kilbeggan Racecourse
 Market House, Kilbeggan
Middleton Park House, Castletown Geoghegan
 Mount Druid, Castletown Geoghegan
 St. Micheal's Church, Castletown Geoghegan

References

External links
Map of Moycashel at openstreetmap.org
Barony of Moycashel, County Westmeath at townlands.ie

Baronies of County Westmeath